George Allan "Red" Peery was a professional baseball pitcher. He played parts of two seasons in Major League Baseball, 1927 for the Pittsburgh Pirates and 1929 for the Boston Braves.

External links

Major League Baseball pitchers
Pittsburgh Pirates players
Boston Braves players
Salt Lake City Bees players
St. Joseph Saints players
Wichita Larks players
Providence Grays (minor league) players
San Antonio Indians players
Newark Bears (IL) players
Baseball players from Utah
1906 births
1985 deaths
People from Payson, Utah